Josiah Clark Nott  (March 31, 1804March 31, 1873) was an American surgeon and anthropologist. He is known for his studies into the etiology of yellow fever and malaria, including the theory that they originate from germs.

Nott, who owned slaves, used his scientific reputation to defend the institution of slavery. He claimed that "the negro achieves his greatest perfection, physical and moral, and also greatest longevity, in a state of slavery". Nott was influenced by the racial theories of Samuel George Morton (1799–1851), one of the inspirators of physical anthropology. Morton collected hundreds of human skulls from around the world and tried to classify them in his attempt at phrenology. Morton had been among the first to claim that he could judge the intellectual capacity of a race by the cranial capacity (the measure of the volume of the interior of the skull). A large skull meant a large brain and high intellectual capacity, and a small skull indicated a small brain and decreased intellectual capacity. By studying these skulls he came to the conclusion of polygenism, that each race had a separate origin.

Early life and education
Nott was born on March 31, 1804, in the U.S. state of South Carolina. He was the son of the Federalist politician and judge Abraham Nott. He received his medical degree from the University of Pennsylvania in 1827 and completed his post-graduate training in Paris. He moved to Mobile, Alabama in 1833 and began a surgical practice.

Career

Nott took up the theory that malaria and yellow fever were caused by parasitic infections with "animalcules" (microorganisms), earlier held by John Crawford. In his 1850 Yellow Fever Contrasted with Bilious Fever he attacked the prevailing miasma theory.

He is often credited as being the first to apply the insect vector theory to yellow fever, then a serious health problem of the American South. However, unlike his contemporary Louis-Daniel Beauperthuy he hasn't actually gone so far that to suggest that mosquitos in fact spread the germs; in fact he explicitly acknowledged that he didn't know how the "animalculae might be communicated through the air or directly to individuals".

Nott lost four of his children to yellow fever in one week in September 1853.

Morton's followers, particularly Nott and George Gliddon (1809–1857) in their monumental tribute to Morton's work, Types of Mankind (1854), carried Morton's ideas further and claimed and backed up his findings which supported the notion of polygenism, which claims that humanity originates from different ancestral lineages; it is the ancestor of the multiregional hypothesis.

In their book, Nott and Gliddon argued that the races of mankind each occupied distinct zoological provinces and did not originate from a single pair of ancestors; they both believed God had created each race and positioned each race in separate geographic provinces. The doctrine of zoological provinces outlined in Types of Mankind did not allow for "superiority" of one type of race over another; each type was suited to its own province, and was superior within its own province. Nott claimed that because races were created in different provinces, that all race types must be of equal antiquity. However Nott and other polygenists, such as Gliddon, believed that the biblical Adam means "to show red in the face" or "blusher"; since only light skinned people can blush, the biblical Adam must be of the Caucasian race.

Nott persistently attacked the scientific basis of the Bible and also rejected the theory of evolution, claiming that the environment does not change any organism into another, and also rejecting common descent. Nott believed monogenism was "absurd" and had no biblical or scientific basis. He pointed to excavations in Egypt which depicted animals and humans as they looked today to refute monogenism and evolution. According to Nott, the monuments and artifacts found in Egypt show us that the "White, Mongolian and Negro existed at least five thousand years ago". Nott claimed that this proved beyond dispute that each race had been created separately.

Nott claimed that the writers of the Bible had no knowledge of any races except themselves and their immediate neighbors, and that the Bible does not concern the whole of the earth's population. According to Nott there are no verses in the Bible which support monogenism and that the only passage the monogenists use is Acts 17:26, "And [he] hath made of one blood all nations of men for to dwell on all the face of the earth, and hath determined the times before appointed, and the bounds of their habitation;" but, according to Nott, the monogenists are wrong in their interpretation of that verse because the "one blood" of Paul's sermon only includes the nations he knew existed, which were local.

In 1856, Nott hired Henry Hotze to translate Arthur de Gobineau's An Essay on the Inequality of the Human Races (1853–55), a founding text of "biological racism" that contrasts with Boulainvilliers (1658–1722)'s theory of races, and Nott  provided an appendix with his most recent results. Gobineau subsequently complained that Hotze's translation had ignored his comments on "American decay generally and slaveholding in particular".

In 1857, Nott and Gliddon again co-edited a book, Indigenous Races of the Earth.  That book built upon the arguments in Types of Mankind that linked anthropology with "scientific" studies of race to establish a supposed natural hierarchy of the races.  The book included chapters from Louis Ferdinand Alfred Maury, J. Atkin Meigs, and Francis Polszky, letters from Louis Agassiz, Joseph Leidy, and A.W. Habersham.

Charles Darwin opposed Nott and Gliddon's polygenist and creationist arguments in his 1871 The Descent of Man, arguing for a monogenism of the human species. Darwin conceived the common origin of all humans (aka single-origin hypothesis) as essential for evolutionary theory. Darwin cited Nott and Gliddon's arguments as an example of those classing the races of man as separate species; Darwin disagreed and he concluded that humanity is one species.

Nott was a founder of the Medical College of Alabama, established in Mobile in 1858, and served as its professor of surgery. In 1860 he successfully appealed to the state legislature for a monetary appropriation and a state charter for the school. During the American Civil War, he served as a Confederate surgeon and staff officer. During the early years of the war he served as director of the Confederate General Army Hospital in Mobile; later, he served in the field as medical director on the staffs of Brig. Gen. Daniel Ruggles and Gen. Braxton Bragg, and as hospital inspector. He lost both of his remaining sons to the war. Upon his own death in 1873, he was interred at Magnolia Cemetery in Mobile.

Honors
A building at The University of Alabama was named Nott Hall in honor of Nott for his work at the predecessor Medical College of Alabama.  This attracted controversy in 2016, with several student groups petitioning that either the building be renamed or an educational plaque be added due to Nott's open racism even by the standards of his era. On August 5, 2020, his name was removed from the building, which was renamed Honors Hall.

Bibliography
 Nott, Josiah Clark. Yellow Fever contrasted with Bilious Fever — Reasons for believing it is a disease sui generis — Its mode of Propagation — Remote Cause — Probable insect or animalcular origin, &c.  New Orleans Medical and Surgical Journal, volume 4 (1848), pp. 563–601.
Nott, Josiah Clark. Sketch of the Epidemic of Yellow Fever of 1847, in Mobile. The Charleston Medical Journal and Review, volume 1 (1848), pp. 1–21 Excerpt, PBS, The Great Fever.
Nott, Josiah Clark. Two Lectures on the Connection between the Biblical and Physical History of Man, Delivered by Invitation, from the Chair of Political Economy, Etc., of the Louisiana University, in December, 1848. (1848)
Nott, Josiah Clark. An Essay on the Natural History of Mankind, Viewed in Connection with Negro Slavery Delivered Before the Southern Rights Association, 14 December 1850. (1851)
Nott, Josiah Clark, George R. Gliddon, Samuel George Morton, Louis Agassiz, William Usher, and Henry S. Patterson. Types of Mankind: Or, Ethnological Researches : Based Upon the Ancient Monuments, Paintings, Sculptures, and Crania of Races, and Upon Their Natural, Geographical, Philological and Biblical History, Illustrated by Selections from the Inedited Papers of Samuel George Morton and by Additional Contributions from L. Agassiz, W. Usher, and H.S. Patterson. (1854)
 Nott, Josiah Clark, George Robins Gliddon, and Louis Ferdinand Alfred Maury. Indigenous Races of the Earth; Or, New Chapters of Ethnological Inquiry; Including Monographs on Special Departments. (1857)

See also 
Scientific racism
Craniometry

References

Further reading

 
 
Keel, Terence. (2018). Divine Variations: How Christian Thought Became Racial Science. Stanford, Cali.: Stanford University Press.
Peterson, Erik L. (2017). "Race and Evolution in Antebellum Alabama: The Polygenist Prehistory We'd Rather Ignore." In: C.D. Lynn et al. (eds)., Evolution Education in the American South, 33–59. New York: Palgrave Macmillan. DOI: 10.1057/978-1-349-95139-0_2.

External links

 

1804 births
1873 deaths
19th-century American physicians
American anthropologists
Perelman School of Medicine at the University of Pennsylvania alumni
Race and intelligence controversy
Proponents of scientific racism
University of Alabama faculty